Mixornis is a genus of passerine birds in the Old World babbler family Timaliidae.

Taxonomy
These species were formerly placed in the genus Macronus. A molecular phylogenetic study published in 2012 found that Macronus was not monophyletic. To create monophyletic genera Macronus was split and some species moved to the resurrected genus Mixornis. Mixornis had been introduced in 1842 by the English zoologist Edward Blyth to accommodate the taxon Timalia chloris. This is a junior synonym of Macronous gularis rubicapillus which had been described in 1833 by Samuel Tickell. It is now one of the subspecies of the pin-striped tit-babbler (Mixornis gularis rubicapilla). The genus name combines the Ancient Greek mixis meaning "mixed" or "mingling" with ornis meaning "bird".

Species
The genus includes the following species:

References

Collar, N. J. & Robson, C. 2007. Family Timaliidae (Babblers)  pp. 70 – 291 in; del Hoyo, J., Elliott, A. & Christie, D.A. eds. Handbook of the Birds of the World, Vol. 12. Picathartes to Tits and Chickadees. Lynx Edicions, Barcelona.

 
Taxa named by Edward Blyth